Meni Levi (born August 6, 1980), is a retired Israeli footballer who played as a right back for Israeli football club Maccabi Tel Aviv.

Levi started playing for Maccabi Tel Aviv from a young age, making his debut for the club as a substitute on January 1, 2000 against Hapoel Haifa. He was considered to be a big prospect in 2001/2002 Israeli football and was named the discovery of the year. Levi scored his first goal in the Israeli Premier League on October 12, 2001, in the 90th minute of a match against Hapoel Petach Tikva in Bloomfield Stadium.

On January 26, 2002 during an Israeli Premier League match against Beitar Jerusalem at Teddy Stadium, Levi suddenly collapsed in the middle of the pitch, away from the run of play. A few moments later, he rose to his feet then collapsed again. He was treated at length on the pitch. Eventually the match was cancelled and Levi was taken to a hospital.

Levi was treated for years in Beit Levinstein, and later returned to his family house in a vegetative state. He is visited by Maccabi Tel Aviv fans, players and management several times a year. Levi sometimes interacts with them with smiles, blinks and tears.

Maccabi Tel Aviv retired the jersey number 12, Levi's number, as a tribute to him.

References

1980 births
Living people
Israeli footballers
Maccabi Tel Aviv F.C. players
Israeli Premier League players
Footballers from Tel Aviv
Association football fullbacks
People with disorders of consciousness